Penmark is a  rural village south-west of Barry near Rhoose in the Vale of Glamorgan, in South Wales. The village is a parish and is a linear village. It has a parish church along the main road running through the village.

Penmark is located near the international airport for Wales, Cardiff International Airport.

Penmark Castle
The village has the remains of a 13th-century castle.

Gallery

See also
 William Howells, the first Mormon missionary in France

References

External links 

www.penmark.org.uk : Penmark community website

Villages in the Vale of Glamorgan
Rhoose